A Different Light is the second full-length album by Sherwood, and it continues the band's musical style. The album contains several re-recorded versions of tracks off their Summer EP (2006), as well as new tracks that help the band drift into new musical territory. It is the first album since the band signed with MySpace Records, and was preceded by several 'Making of' videos available on the band's MySpace page. The song "The Best in Me" was used as the opening song for MTV's show College Life.

Track listing

References

2007 albums
Sherwood (band) albums
Albums produced by Lou Giordano